Stuart Mackie (born 12 February 1985 in Frimley, Surrey, England) is a rugby union hooker for Rugby Nice in the French  Fédérale 1 division.

He previously played for Newcastle Falcons and London Irish in the Guinness Premiership.

References

External links
 Guinness Premiership profile
 Rugby Nice profile

1985 births
Living people
London Irish players
People from Frimley